Events during the year 2008 in Poland.

Incumbents

Events

January 
 23 January – Mirosławiec air disaster; an EADS CASA C-295 military transport plane crashed as it approached the Mirosławiec runway, killing all passengers and crew: 20 victims. 3 days of national mourning followed.

March 
 1 March – Cyclone Emma causes damage in Poland

June 
 4 June – 6 miners died in a blast in Borynia Coal Mine.

August 
 5–6 June – 2008 Poland tornado outbreak; 4 fatalities.

Deaths

July 
 10 July: Krystyna Kersten, Polish historian.
 13 July: Bronisław Geremek, Polish politician, died in a car accident.
 14 July: Antoni Heda, Polish general and partisan.

See also
2008 in Polish television

 
Poland
pl:2008#Wydarzenia w Polsce